Georges Abou Khazen, OFM (born on 3 August 1947 in Aïn Zebdeh, Lebanon) is the current Apostolic Vicar of Aleppo.

Life
Georges Abou Khazen joined the Congregation of the Franciscan on 3 August 1972,  and made his perpetual vows and received on 28 June 1973 his  ordination to the priesthood.

Pope Francis appointed him on 4 November 2013 Vicar Apostolic of Aleppo and Titular Bishop of Rusadus after the resignation of his predecessor Giuseppe Nazzaro as Apostolic Administrator. His episcopal ordination was made by Cardinal Prefect of the Congregation for the Oriental Churches, Cardinal Leonardo Sandri on 11 January of the following year.

External links

 http://www.catholic-hierarchy.org/bishop/baboukh.html

1947 births
Roman Catholic bishops in Syria
21st-century Roman Catholic titular bishops
Lebanese Friars Minor
Living people
Lebanese Roman Catholic bishops